This was a new event to the 2011 ITF Women's Circuit. 
Mihaela Buzărnescu and Teodora Mirčić won the title by defeating Eva Hrdinová and Veronika Kapshay in the final 6–3, 6–1.

Seeds

Draw

Draw

References
 Main Draw

Saransk Cup - Doubles
Saransk Cup
2011 in Russian tennis